Capoeta bergamae is a species of freshwater cyprinid fish native to  Turkey. The species is also known as the Aegean scraper.

It is widespread in western Anatolia and lives in rivers ranging from the Bakacak river on the Biga Peninsula south to the Dalaman River. It is threatened by the massive pollution of rivers and streams and water abstraction, leading to habitat loss. The fish is up to 20 cm long. It is occasionally eaten, but is not widely commercialized.

References

Bergamae
Endemic fauna of Turkey
Fish of Turkey
Fish described in 1969
Taxonomy articles created by Polbot